Fritz Ernst Oppenheimer (1898–1968) was a German American lawyer. Being Jewish, he emigrated from Nazi Germany to the United States in 1940, but later returned as part of the Supreme Headquarters Allied Expeditionary Force and helped draft denazification laws.

Born in Berlin as son of lawyer Ernst Oppenheimer and Amalie Friedländer, Fritz Oppenheimer studied law at the Humboldt University of Berlin, the University of Freiburg, and the University of Breslau, after serving during World War I. He joined his father's law firm in 1925, practicing international law, and took over the firm after his father's death in 1929.

After the Machtergreifung, it was increasingly difficult for Oppenheimer to work, even though he was allowed to continue practicing for being a World War I veteran. Finally, he decided to emigrate, first to London in 1937, then to New York City in 1940, where he joined Cadwalader, Wickersham & Taft. In 1943, he volunteered to join the United States Army, thereby becoming a naturalized U.S. citizen, and eventually served as legal consultant to General Lucius D. Clay.

He retired in 1957, and moved to Palo Alto, California. He died in an accident during a trip to East Africa.

References 

1898 births
1968 deaths
20th-century German lawyers
Jewish emigrants from Nazi Germany to the United States
People associated with Cadwalader, Wickersham & Taft
Humboldt University of Berlin alumni
University of Freiburg alumni
University of Breslau alumni
German Jewish military personnel of World War I